Sailing Along is a 1938 British musical comedy film directed by Sonnie Hale and starring Jessie Matthews, Barry MacKay, Jack Whiting, Roland Young, Frank Pettingell, Noel Madison and Alastair Sim. It includes many staged song and dance routines either on barges or on the dock edge.

Premise
A rich owner of a fleet of three-masted barges operating on the River Thames in central London has a prospective step-daughter, Kay (Jessie Matthews). She falls in love with the son of one of his barge masters, who has been put to work on a barge at the bottom of the ladder. She initially wants to gives up her chance of stardom as a singer to be with him. Ultimately everyone supports her singing career.

Cast
Jessie Matthews as Kay Martin
Barry MacKay as Steve Barnes
Jack Whiting as Dicky Randall
Roland Young as Anthony Gulliver the rich father
Noel Madison as Windy
Frank Pettingell as Skipper Barnes
Alastair Sim as Sylvester the artist
Athene Seyler as Victoria Gulliver
Margaret Vyner as Stephanie
 William Dewhurst as Winton
Peggy Novak as Jill
Patrick Barr as Seaman at Birthday Party 
 Arthur Denton as Man Auditioning Chorus Girls

Production
Sailing Along was filmed at Pinewood Studios from August to December 1937, directed by Sonnie Hale. The screenplay was written by Lesser Samuels and Sonnie Hale, based on a story by Selwyn Jepson. For the last big dance number—which lasted seven minutes on screen—the camera followed Whiting and Matthews for nearly a mile, and the set was so large that it had to be built across two studios. Including rehearsals, the pair danced an estimated twenty miles to complete that single scene.

Release
The film opened at the Gaumont Haymarket on 17 April 1938, and was generally released on 29 August 1938.

Critical reception
In a contemporary review, The Monthly Film Bulletin wrote, "The best features of the film are the songs and the dances which are cleverly treated, particularly in the final sequence where Kay and Dicky perform a really original and brilliantly executed tap ballet. Jessie Matthews acts Kay with unrestrained gaiety and fire, sings adequately and dances superbly. Jack Whiting, as Dicky, matches her in dancing ability and outshines her in singing and acting, Barry Mackay tries hard not to make Steve too imbecile, while Roland Young (Gulliver) and Athene Seyler, as his prim sister, serve up a banquet of laughs from the few crumbs that fall their way."

In his review for The Era on 27 January 1938, R.B. Marriott applauded Hale's direction as "swift, gay and witty", and added that "Sailing Along was certainly the most polished romantic comedy  with music ever made in our studios: and for vitality, deftness and general entertainment value it equals any, and is superior to, many that have come from that over-rated motion picture making town across the Atlantic Ocean."

References

External links

1938 films
British musical comedy films
1938 musical comedy films
Films directed by Sonnie Hale
Films shot at Pinewood Studios
Films set in London
British black-and-white films
Gainsborough Pictures films
1930s English-language films
1930s British films